Tae Hyun-sil (born November 11, 1941) is a South Korean actress. Tae was born in Songjin, North Hamgyong province, Korea in 1941. While studying Film at Dongguk University, she was selected as a TV actress in a public recruit held by KBS. While preparing to star for a drama series, Tae was offered to be an exclusive actress of Shin Film established by Shin Sang-ok. Tae's debut film is Beautiful Shroud directed by Lee Hyeong-pyo in 1962. With the film, she won New Actress from the 1963 Buil Awards. Since her debut as an actress, Tae has starred in about 300 films. 250 films were shot during 7 years, and were mostly roles in depicting a cheerful university student or cute daughter characters. Tae married businessman Kim Cheol-hwan in 1968.

She resumed her acting career by starring in a daily soap opera Jangmi-ui geori.

Filmography
*Note; the whole list is referenced.

Awards
1964 the 2nd Blue Dragon Film Awards : Favorite Actress
1976 the 15th Grand Bell Awards : Best Supporting Actress for (원산공작)
1977 the 13th Baeksang Arts Awards : Best Film Actress for (아내)

References

External links

1941 births
South Korean actresses
Dongguk University alumni
Living people
People from Kimchaek
Best Actress Paeksang Arts Award (film) winners